Evros may refer to:
 the Greek name of the Maritsa river running through Bulgaria and forming the land border between Turkey and Greece
 Evros (regional unit), an administrative division in northern Greece